Argentina is subdivided into twenty-three federated states called provinces (singular provincia) and one called the autonomous city (ciudad autónoma) of Buenos Aires,  which is the federal capital of the republic as decided by the Argentine Congress.
The provinces and the capital have their own constitutions, and exist under a federal system.

History 

During the War of Independence the main cities and their surrounding countrysides became provinces though the intervention of their cabildos. The Anarchy of the Year XX completed this process, shaping the original thirteen provinces. Jujuy seceded from Salta in 1834, and the thirteen provinces became fourteen.
After seceding for a decade, Buenos Aires Province accepted the 1853 Constitution of Argentina in 1861, and its capital city was made a federal territory in 1880.

A law from 1862 designated as national territories those under federal control but outside the frontiers of the provinces. In 1884 they served as bases for the establishment of the governorates of Misiones, Formosa, Chaco, La Pampa, Neuquén, Río Negro, Chubut, Santa Cruz and Tierra del Fuego.
The agreement about a frontier dispute with Chile in 1900 created the National Territory of Los Andes; its lands were incorporated into Jujuy, Salta and Catamarca in 1943. La Pampa and Chaco became provinces in 1951. Misiones did so in 1953, and Formosa, Neuquén, Río Negro, Chubut and Santa Cruz, in 1955. The last national territory, Tierra del Fuego, became the Tierra del Fuego, Antártida e Islas del Atlántico Sur Province in 1990.

Political organization 

Argentina is a federation of twenty-three provinces and one autonomous city, Buenos Aires. Provinces are divided for administration purposes into departments and municipalities, except for Buenos Aires Province, which is divided into partidos and localidades. Buenos Aires City itself is divided into communes (comuna) and non-official neighbourhoods (barrios).

Provinces hold all the power that they chose not to delegate to the federal government; they must be representative commonwealths and must not contradict the Constitution. Beyond this, they are fully autonomous: they enact their own constitutions, freely organize their local governments, and own and manage their natural and financial resources. Thus, each province has its own set of provincial laws and justice system, a supreme court, a governor, an autonomous police force, and a congress; in eight provinces, this legislature is bicameral, comprising an upper chamber (the Senate) and a lower chamber (the House of Deputies), while in the remaining fifteen provinces and in Buenos Aires City, it is unicameral.

In case of sedition, insurrection, territorial invasion, or any other emergent against the laws of the Nation on any province or the federal capital, the Congress has the authority to declare a federal intervention on the compromised district, even in the absence of a formal request by the affected part. When Congress is in recess and thus unable to decide, the President is entitled to decree such intervention, but this executive order is subject to Congressional override upon the Houses' immediate reassembly.
Once the intervention is declared the compromised district's government is immediately dissolved—in whole or in part depending on Congressional decision—and the President appoints a representative or intervenor, who will serve for a short time until the emergency is solved. 
Since 1983 four provinces were intervened, namely Catamarca, Corrientes (twice), Santiago del Estero (twice), and Tucumán.

During the 20th century, some provinces have had governments that are traditionally controlled by a single family (i.e. the Saadi family in Catamarca, or the Sapag family in Neuquén); in one case, it is still the same situation from 2009: the Province of San Luis was ruled almost without a break by the Rodríguez Saá family since December 1983.

Article 61 of the Constitution of the city of Buenos Aires states that "Suffrage is free, equal, secret, universal, compulsory and not accumulative. The foreign residents enjoy this right, with the correlative obligations, on equal terms with Argentine citizens registered in this district, in the terms established by the law."

List of provinces

See also 

 Comparison between Argentine provinces and countries by GDP (PPP) per capita
 Demographics of Argentina
 ISO 3166-2:AR, the ISO codes for the provinces of Argentina.
 List of Argentine provinces by gross regional product
 List of Argentine provinces by Human Development Index

Notes

References

Bibliography
Legal documents

 

Books

External links 

 Provinces of Argentina at statoids.com
 Argentine Provinces since 1973 at World Statesmen

 
Subdivisions of Argentina
Provinces
Provinces, Argentina
Argentina geography-related lists